Louis Rossi (born 23 June 1989 in Le Mans) is a French Grand Prix motorcycle racer, best known for winning the 2012 French Grand Prix in the Moto3 class. He currently competes in the World Endurance Championships aboard the #Ducati 6, he has also previously competed in the French 125GP Championship (where he finished runner-up in 2007), the Spanish 125GP Championship, and the Endurance FIM World Championship.

Career statistics

By season

Races by year
(key)

References

External links

 

1989 births
Living people
French motorcycle racers
125cc World Championship riders
Moto3 World Championship riders
Moto2 World Championship riders
French people of Italian descent
Sportspeople from Le Mans
FIM Superstock 1000 Cup riders
21st-century French people